The Mixed 50 metre pistol SH1 event at the 2008 Summer Paralympics took place on September 12 at the Beijing Shooting Range Hall.

Qualification round

Q Qualified for final

Final

References

Shooting at the 2008 Summer Paralympics